Walcottoceras is a genus of cephalopods from the Lower Ordovician included in the ellesmerocerid family Protocycloceratidae according to Rousseau Flower in 1964.

The shell of Walcottoceras is small, slender, compressed, with prominent annuli (complete encircling ribs or costae); may be straight or slightly endogastric. 
Could be said to be an annulate Ectenolites.

Walcottoceras has been found in the Lower Ordovician of British Columbia, Alberta, Utah, and New York.

References

 Rousseau H Flower, 1964. The Nautiloid Order Ellesmeroceratida (Cephalopoda), Memori 12. State Bureau of Mines and Mineral Resourecues. Socorro, New Mexico 
  Walcottoceras Fossilworks 16 Oct 2014.
 Jack Sepkoski, 2000.  List of cephalopod genera

Prehistoric nautiloid genera
Ellesmerocerida
Paleozoic life of Alberta
Paleozoic life of British Columbia